Scartichthys crapulatus is a species of combtooth blenny found in the southeast Pacific ocean, and is endemic to Chile.  This species reaches a length of  SL.

Etymology 
The species name "crapulatus" (Latin for "drunk") refers to the soporific effects of the consumption of Scartichthys flesh.

References

crapulatus
Fish described in 1990
Endemic fauna of Chile